Sergei Vyacheslavovich Ragulin (born 10 January 1967) is a former Russian professional footballer.

Club career
He made his professional debut in the Soviet Second League in 1985 for FC Lokomotiv Chelyabinsk.

References

1967 births
Footballers from Moscow
Living people
Soviet footballers
Russian footballers
Association football defenders
FC Lokomotiv Moscow players
FC Iskra Smolensk players
FC Lida players
FC Tyumen players
FC Torpedo Moscow players
FC Lokomotiv Nizhny Novgorod players
Russian Premier League players
FC FShM Torpedo Moscow players